ASL Airlines Belgium, (ASLB) formerly TNT Airways, is a Belgian cargo airline operating chartered flights mainly to European destinations. It has its head office and  hub on the grounds of Liège Airport. The airline used to be a subsidiary of TNT Express but was acquired by ASL Aviation Holdings DAC and subsequently rebranded in 2016. ASL Aviation Holdings DAC, the parent company of ASL Airlines Belgium, is headquartered in Swords, County Dublin, Ireland.

ASLB operates worldwide Boeing 737 freighter services under the ASL Aviation Holdings brand and for major express integrator and e-commerce customers including FedEx and Alibaba. In addition to its own fleet, the airline also manages various third-party airlines providing aircraft for FedEx's European network.

History 

TNT Express was established in Australia in the 1940s, by Ken Thomas. The company expanded from a single truck to road and rail freight services across Australia including, for the first time, new overnight services. In 1958, the company became known as Thomas Nationwide Transport or TNT for short and, by 1961, TNT had become so successful that it was listed on the Australian stock exchange.

The company was founded in 1999 as TNT Airways in Belgium. Air cargo operations began in Belgium and operated from Liège Airport. TNT Airways started to work with BAe 146-300 and Airbus A300. This transformation brought the company to an extension from a European to a Worldwide coverage. The Group introduced their first Boeing 737-300 in 2003.

In May 2004, TNT Post Group (TPG) announced major expansion of the TNT Express European air hub in Liège, Belgium. To consolidate and improve recognition of the TNT brand, the name 'TPG' was dropped in favor of 'TNT' in 2005.

The split-up of TNT N.V. which was announced in December 2010, materialized in May 2011 when TNT Express and TNT Post (now: PostNL) were separately listed on the Amsterdam Stock Exchange.

In May 2016, ASL Aviation Holdings acquires TNT Airways which joins the ASL portfolio of 9 other airlines in Europe, South Africa and Asia. Rebranded as ASL Airlines Belgium, the Airline signs a multi-year service agreement with the new Fedex/TNT combination.

Destinations 

As of November 2021, ASL Airlines Belgium serves six scheduled destinations in North America and China under its own brand name with several dozen more operated as contracted charters, e. g. on behalf of DHL.

Fleet 

, the ASL Airlines Belgium fleet consists of the following registered aircraft:

Current fleet

Retired Fleet 

In June 2021, ASL Aviation Holdings announced an order with Boeing for up to 20 737-800 Boeing Converted Freighter (BCF) aircraft - 10 firm orders and 10 options at the Paris Air Show. This was extended to an additional 20 737-800 Boeing Converted Freighters (BCF) in March 2022.  ASL's order, including options brings the number of 737-800BCF to 40 aircraft. Eleven aircraft operate for ASL Airlines Belgium, ASL Airlines France, ASL Airlines Ireland and ASL joint venture airline, K-Mile Asia.

Accidents and incidents 
 On 15 June 2006, TNT Airways Flight 325N, a Boeing 737-300 cargo aircraft operating a flight from Liège Airport to London Stansted Airport had to divert to East Midlands Airport due to bad weather. On final approach the autopilot was disengaged for a short period. The aircraft touched down on the grass to the left of the runway, resulting in the right main landing gear being detached and the right wing tip and engine scraping the ground. The flight crew managed to lift off again and subsequently made an emergency diversion to Birmingham International Airport, where a landing was performed on the nose and left main landing gear, during which the aircraft scraped its nose and right engine. There were no injuries, but thousands of passengers had to be moved to other airports. The cause of the incident was determined to be a poorly-timed message from local air traffic control which a pilot misinterpreted, causing the plane to descend too quickly. The autopilot system was disengaged due to a "momentary lapse". The flight crewmembers were said by the airline to have managed the situation with skill once the error had been detected, but were dismissed from service with the company as a result of the incident.

References

External links 
 
 Official website 

Airlines of Belgium
Airlines established in 1999
Cargo airlines of Belgium
Association of European Airlines
Postal system of the Netherlands
Companies based in Liège Province
Belgian companies established in 1999